Prikrnica is a small village north of Dole pri Krašcah in the Municipality of Moravče in central Slovenia. The area is part of the traditional region of Upper Carniola. It is now included with the rest of the municipality in the Central Slovenia Statistical Region.

Name
Prikrnica was attested in historical sources as Prikernicz in 1391, and as Prikarnitz and Prykarnicz in 1429, among other spellings.

References

External links

Prikrnica on Geopedia

Populated places in the Municipality of Moravče